Jerzy Bereś (September 14, 1930 in New Sącz – December 25, 2012 in Kraków) was a Polish sculptor, author and performance artist.

Creativity
In his work he used artistic manifestations. His works and projects are often political and ethical statements, preaching the demand of the "creative act" on the subject. Jerzy Bereś developed his own unique style, but his practices were related: happening and these performance, although I never admit to any relationship with these trends in the arts demonstrations, calling their actions (actions, " Masses "). Beres' Art is an art symbol, a metaphor, and a metaphysics. His art is the result of a dispute with known artist of the twentieth century such as the dramatists Witkacy, Kantor and conceptual artist, Duchamp.

Artistic activity 
In 1956, he completed a program in sculpture in the Academy of Fine Arts in Xawery Dunikowski.

His first solo exhibition was in 1958 in the Kraków House of Artists, where he presented the sculptures: 'Lullaby', 'The Sun', 'Mother', 'Eve', 'anxiety', 'Idyll' made of plaster and reinforced concrete. His experience at this exhibition influenced his decision to halt the work he had been doing up to this point and along with it the traditional methods he learned from the Academy of Fine Arts in Kraków. Just before 1960, he created his first sculptures of wood:'Rzepicha' and 'Bart'. However, these were very realistic renderings that led the artist to turn to minimalism. Since then, his sculptures in wood have become increasingly simple and stay as close as possible to the nature of the material used. In 1960 he created work out of natural materials  in the series hallucinations and ine 1967 in the series The Oracle.  He used field stones, hemp rope, scraps of canvas bag, leather straps (the characteristic of materials for his work).

In 1968, Beres presented in Foksal Gallery in Warsaw first artistic manifestation of prophecy 'I'. It opens up a whole series of speeches that are a commentary on politics, religion, art and philosophy, in which the artist often uses his own body and the object.  His work called "Masses" discusses the most important Polish problems; the  Mass Romantic,the political Mass, and the Mass in Polish.

Selected performances

1968 - Prophecy, Gallery Foksal, London
1968 - The Prophecy II, Gallery Krzysztofory, Kraków
1968 - Bread, painted black, Gallery Krzysztofory, Kraków
1972 - bread colorfully painted, Office Andrzej Partum Poetry, Warsaw
1972 - Transfiguration and Art Center, Södertälje
1973 - Transfiguration II, Gallery Desa, Kraków
1973 - Transfiguration III Fri Altar author, BWA, Lublin
1973 - Untitled, Contemporary Gallery, Warsaw
1973 - Bid, Gallery Pi, Kraków
1974 - wooden pathway, Gruga Park, Essen
1974 - a beautiful altar, the altar clean, BWA, Wrocław
1974 - Face The Altar, Studio Gallery, London
1975 - reflective Mass, the Metal Works. Szadkowski, Kraków
1975 - The Altar erotic Coffee Club Artists, Kraków
1975 - The Altar laughing MDK Art Gallery of Labyrinth, Lublin
1975 - Round honor, Runek Old Town, Zamosc
1976 - Bonfire of art, BWA, Koszalin
1976 - Altar sculpture, BWA, Kraków
1976 - The Rite sincerity, Gallery On The Floor boat
1976 - existential Ritual, Culture, Lublin
1976 - Altar of time, Castle Świdwin
1976 - The Rite philosophical, student club, Torun
1977 - culture ritual, Riviera Club Student Repair, London
1977 - Life's Work, STU Theatre Gallery, Kraków
1977 - art Mass, Club Jaszczury, Kraków
1978 - artist Monument, the way of Warcina and Kępice
1978 - Philosopher's Stone, Gallery Labyrinth, Lublin
1978 - Mass Art, Gallery Encouragement, London
1978 - Mass Romantic, Gallery Krzysztofory, Kraków
1979 - philosophical Mass, Gallery Art-Forum, boat
1979 - author Mass, Gallery of Modern Art, "HOUSE", Wrocław
1979 - avant-garde Mass, National Outdoor Young Artists and theorists, Świeszyno
1979 - Work and Word Haus van Kapel Bewaring Amsterdam
1979 - Mystery, Midland Group Gallery, Nottingham, the Academy Gallery in Liverpool, Cotes Watermill in Loughborough, Fine Art Dept. University of Technology, Wolverhampton, Chapter Arts Centre in Cardiff, Kennington Oval House in London
1979 - Opus, College of Higher Education in Hull, Gallery Third Eye Center, Glasgow
1980 - dialogue with Ignacy Witkiewicz, Polish Artists Union Gallery "Prism", Kraków
1980 - political Mass, National Outdoor Young Artists and theorists, Świeszyno
1981 - Clean work, Gallery Krzysztofory, Kraków
1981 - freedom Barrows Meetings International Artists, Scientists and theoreticians of art, Osieki
1981 - dialogue with Marcel Duchamp, Gallery BWA, Lublin
1981 - Manifestation romantic, the main square, Kraków
1981 - image, Academy of Music, Kraków
1983 - Art and Reality, Gallery BWA, Lublin
1983 - Mass Reflection II, Gallery Krzysztofory, Kraków
1984 - Polish Mass Over the Moat Gallery, Wrocław
1984 - Lecture: The dispute over the value of the highest. And part of the Gallery BWA, Lublin
1985 - Five outbreaks of Church. Divine Mercy, London
1986 - Lecture: The dispute over the value of the highest. II, Gallery BWA, Lublin
1986 - Picture Polish, Gallery Dziekanka, Warsaw
1988 - The Prophecy II, Gallery Krzysztofory, Kraków
1988 - II dialogue with Marcel Duchamp, Modern Art Oxford, Oxford
1988 - image of the Polish, Slaughterhouse Gallery, London
1989 - the second presentation of the living monument. The Prophecy II University Gallery, Cieszyn
1989 - shame, CRP, Orońsko
1990 - Untitled, Gallery BWA, Green Mountain
1990 - III dispute with Marcel Duchamp CCA, London
1991 - Dispute with Ignacy Witkiewicz BWA, Koszalin
1991 - IV dispute with Marcel Duchamp, Museum Bochum - Kunstsammlung, Bochum
1991 - dialogue with Tadeusz Kantor, Gallery Krzysztofory, Kraków
1991 - Antyperformance Action Arts Center, Warsaw
1993 - Polish Erotic, National Museum, London
1993 - Presentation of the living monument. The Prophecy II, BWA, Wrocław
1994 - The Challenge, Gallery Encouragement, London
1994 - Challenge II, Gallery BWA, Lublin
1995 - Monument Vivant, Gallery Le Lieu, Quebec
1995 - The last dispute with Marcel Duchamp, Gallery Language Plus, Alma
1997 - Duel Challenge IV of Utopia, Gallery Manhattan, boat
1999 - Scream, Museum of Sandomierz, Castle, Sandomierz
2012 - Toast II, Contexts. II Ephemeral Art Festival, Sokołowsko

Outdoor projects
Wladyslaw Jagiello monument in Nidzica
Altar of St. Families in the Church of Our Lady of Fatima in Tarnów
Rondo sculpture 1 in front of the Opera in Bydgoszcz

Bibliography
George Beres, hallucinations, oracles, altars, challenges occur category. National Museum in Poznan, National Museum in Kraków, Poznan and Kraków, 1995, 
George Beres, Art bending force, angle occur. Contemporary Art, Kraków 2007
 Avant-garde in the open air: Osieki and Lazy 1963–1981. Poland awngarda the second half of the twentieth century in the collection of the Museum in Koszalin., Ed. Museum in Koszalin, Koszalin 2008,

References

Polish sculptors
Polish male sculptors
Polish contemporary artists
Polish performance artists
1930 births
2012 deaths